, also known under the alias of , is a character and the main protagonist in Devil May Cry, an action-adventure hack and slash video game series by Japanese developer and publisher Capcom. Introduced as the protagonist of the 2001 game with the same name, Dante was a former devil hunter dedicated to exterminating them and other supernatural foes in revenge for losing his mother Eva and having his twin brother, Vergil, lost. He is the son of Sparda, inheriting demonic powers which he uses with a variety of weapons in the games. After returning to the Demon World, he along with his brother Vergil are the current undisputed rulers of demon world. The character also appears in several Devil May Cry novels and manga volumes and is featured in the 2007 anime television series. Dante has also made multiple guest appearances in crossover games. Since 2005, he has been portrayed in voice acting and motion capture by Reuben Langdon.

Named after the Italian poet Dante Alighieri, the character was designed to fit Devil May Cry game designer Hideki Kamiya's vision of a "cool and stylish" man; his personality was based on the title character of the Cobra manga series. Dante has been modified in response to criticism in his role in Devil May Cry 2 (2003) as his personality changed making him more serious and less talkative, drifting away from his original persona. Devil May Cry 3 (2005) features a young, cocky Dante, and in the following games an older yet still cocky Dante. Capcom handles the character in the main Devil May Cry series, while Ninja Theory oversaw his persona in DmC: Devil May Cry (2013).

Dante's characterization as a cocky demon hunter with supernatural abilities has turned him into one of the most iconic protagonists in gaming ever since his introduction. Reuben Langdon's portrayal of Dante has also been the subject of praise. Comparatively, his redesign and characterization in DmC: Devil May Cry was highly controversial for the drastic change of his appearance, most notably his iconic white hair.

Concept and influences 

Dante debuted in Devil May Cry, a game originally intended as part of Capcom's Resident Evil franchise. Series creator Hideki Kamiya rewrote the story, taking it from Dante Alighieri's Divine Comedy. He was originally going to be a Western policeman. His early name, Tony Redgrave, served as a reference to one of the characters from Resident Evil, Chris Redfield. According to Kamiya, the title character of Buichi Terasawa's Cobra manga series was the basis of Dante's personality. To give the character's "stylishness" he dressed him in a long coat to make him "showy" and made him a non-smoker; Kamiya saw that as "more cool". Dante wears red clothing—the traditional Japanese color for a heroic figure—in contrast to Leon S. Kennedy, a character Kamiya created for Resident Evil 2, who wears blue clothes.

Kamiya said that he saw Dante as "a character that you would want to go out drinking with", someone who was not a show-off but would "pull some ridiculous, mischievous joke" instead to endear people to him (and make the character familiar to audiences). When asked about the relationship between Dante and Trish, Kamiya said their bond was superior to love. Kamiya's keywords when describing the character were "composure" and "ambiance". Although Kamiya was not the main writer of the first two Devil May Cry novels, he saw Shinya Goikeda's depiction of Dante as similar to his own. In development, Dante was originally called Tony Redgrade and did not carry a sword.

Devil May Cry was designed from the ground up around Dante's acrobatics and combat abilities. Kamiya gave Tsuchibayashi freedom when designing Dante though there were concept arts Kamiya did not accept. Tsuchibayashi produced the 3D model based on other staff member's clothing and an unclear relationship between Dante and Trish. The Devil Trigger form gave him difficulties to the idea of giving him wings and altering his face, resulting in the artist performing to many sketches. An alternate outfit was developed featuring an older Dante though the designer never asked for specifics about. Nevertheless, he believes this design made Dante look more like Vergil. Tsuchibayashi says other sketches did not provide more difficulties as there was no need to match his personality.

Hideaki Itsuno said that for Devil May Cry 5, Dante was influenced by mecha anime he watched when he was young. Itsuno cited the character's conflict with his family but while showing powers that would reveal mechas. Itsuno views Dante's early defeat by Vergil's alterego Urizen and his awakening of new devil powers alongside his new sword Dante as one of the most important changes in his characterization in Devil May Cry 5.

Redesigns
After the success of the first Devil May Cry game, Capcom inserted Dante into a game already in development. This necessitated the maturing of his characterisation. Dante's change to a more-taciturn character was a decision made by a producer who disliked his previous incarnation. The staff aimed to make him look older—in his 30s—than his original self, implying that something dramatic had happened to change his personality. Dante and Lucia dressed in Diesel fashions appealed to the developers.

Dante's final design was left up to Kamiya, who discussed with Bingo Morihashi how the character should be portrayed. Kamiya felt that early depictions of Dante were too quiet and wanted a character who was more "wild" and wore different clothing (such as his sleeveless jacket). Dante appears bare-chested underneath his coat, something that surprised the audience. This design was meant to fit his young personality as well as contrast Vergil's fully clothed looked. Additionally, similar to Dante's longsword  and red clothing, Vergil was also made to wield a Japanese katana and wear blue clothing. Ikeno said he liked the character but had issues with it. Dante's Devil Trigger forms were designed by Kazuma Kaneko of Atlus. The Capcom staff was impressed with Kaneko's work, and Ikeno felt that it was not difficult to model. A wallpaper with Dante and Vergil's Devil Trigger forms was designed as a tribute to the Japanese show Super Sentai once defeating the game. Dante was designed to be easy to control, in contrast to Vergil who was more difficult but stronger.

Dante was designed in that game by Tatsuya Yoshikawa, who called the character in his original appearance "the ultimate Hollywood action superstar". Yoshikawa wanted to make Dante older in his 30s or 40s. His design included a stubble which reflected his "cool" personality since he did not care about shaving. For Devil May Cry 4, Dante's body was more suitable for fighting and his personality was more intense; Yoshikawa emphasised the character's sternness and naughtiness. Dante was given a variety of costumes, with one intended to indicate mystery. Several weapons in the series are character-specific. One is Pandora, a firearm designed by Kobayashi who noted that he wanted to include a "transforming, multi-purpose AWD in Dante's arsenal. Something that could be used as an over-the-shoulder rocket launcher, or a crossbow, etc. In its final form, I wanted it to transform into something that would be even bigger than Dante himself." The weapon was inspired by anime series such as Macross and Gundam. The staff felt that Dante received more missions and weapons than they had originally intended.

Dante and Nero's appearances were changed in the E3 2018 trailer for Devil May Cry 5, confusing fans who wondered if Nero was Dante. After seeing the older Dante at the trailer's end, Capcom noted that fans realised who was who and were pleased with the designs. While designing this incarnation of the character, a total of six outfits were produced until the final one was chosen. As a "weathered devil hunter", his leather rider's jacket had custom stitching tailored to fit his body, so it is easier to get around in. Like his Devil May Cry 4 design, Dante reflects the idea of a man who does not care about others' opinions of his look. Both his and Nero's designs were developed to fit their personalities. According to the company, Dante "hasn't gone wild for no reason".

Personality
In Devil May Cry 2, his goofy attitude was replaced with a more serious edgy type of personality. The staff felt that Dante's stylishness remained true to the original character (despite his change in personality) because of his movements. Daigo Ikeno was responsible for Dante's appearance in Devil May Cry 2 and 3. In developing the former, he attempted to make Dante more handsome. In retrospect, Ikeno was disappointed with the character's inaction in the game. In the prequel game, Devil May Cry 3: Dante's Awakening, Dante was a younger, more arrogant character than in the previous instalments. The designers of Devil May Cry 2 returned to design his new look, which was based on the Japanese band Johnnys. This Dante showed more skin under his jacket which the staff believed would fit his younger persona. Trying to remain true to Kamiya's original idea, the staff worked carefully to make his actions and personality appealing. Bingo Morihashi said that Dante's characterisation was meant as a departure from Kamiya's style, and more of a team effort. According to Morihashi, despite seeing the character in three games, he had trouble understanding him. Although Dante is a strong character, he opens up to others. Fan response to this Dante led Morihashi to say that the team was inspired by the Devil May Cry Dante but needed to change him. Nevertheless, the character's role in facing the world affected the writer. Dante and his identical twin brother Vergil represents one of the themes of Devil May Cry 3—familial love. While initially Dante only wishes to have fun while fighting demons, he is moved by Lady's determination to stop her father. He decides to stop Lady's corrupted father as well as Vergil who wishes to open the gate to the demon world.

Devil May Cry 4 producer Hiroyuki Kobayashi noted before the game's release that they aimed to make Dante seem significantly more powerful than its other protagonist, Nero, to create a difference between the strength of a "veteran" compared with a "rookie"; the series' continuity also dictated that Dante display the power he possessed after the events of the first game and its prequel (Devil May Cry 3). The introduction of a new protagonist had been discussed multiple times but was only approved under the condition that Dante also had to be featured in the game. The staff were afraid of negative feedback similar to what had happened to Konami's 2001 game Metal Gear Solid 2: Sons of Liberty, which proved highly controversial because of switching protagonists. As a result, the team tried balancing Dante and Nero's strength. Due to the physical similarities between Dante and Nero, the staff aimed to make their designs unique and make their personalities stand out in their interactions with other characters. An example was the Devil May Cry 4 antagonist, Agnus. Nero remained at odds with Agnus in cutscenes, but Dante mocked Agnus in a musical taunt before the boss fight with him which signified how different the two playable characters were in terms of personality.

Itsuno initially found Dante's motivations in early games simple: "Beat this bad guy." With Devil May Cry 5, the goal was to imbue curiosity and drive. Matt Walker pointed to Dante's desire to see if Urizen was connected to his brother Vergil, giving further depth to his characterisation. The character's early defeat at the hands of Urizen coupled with the destruction of his sword Rebellion was meant to emphasise Dante's weak powers set by the narrative and how, across it, he would gain new skills to face the antagonist in a rematch. Furthermore, Dante and Nero would respect one and other as they became friends at the end of the previous game. The game's climactic event where Nero awakens his demonic powers and stops the struggle between Dante and Vergil was meant to give the story a deeper form. With regard to how Dante would play, Itsuno said he would be more like his Devil May Cry 3 persona. Nevertheless, he said that Dante is more mature from a personality standpoint since he still wishes to protect humanity and honour the legacy of his father, Sparda.

Fighting style
Artist Yuichiro Hiraki felt Dante looked like a "nihilistic anti-hero with a bit of a dark side", based on his early concept art by character designer Makoto Tsuchibayashi. As a result, he wrote him as a character who would rely on his demonic powers,  during the game. Shortly after the game's development, Kamiya said that his personality would be more animated (which gave Hiraki the idea that Dante would be an "incorrigible joke-cracker") and the Devil Trigger was downplayed. Hiraki began drawing the character stylishly, working on Dante's gameplay, his swordsmanship  and his handling of the guns (Ebony and Ivory). Other gameplay elements were based on the fighting-game series Virtua Fighter and Tekken. Dante's use of a shotgun was retained for Capcom's horror game, Resident Evil 4. Hiraki did not find the use fireweapon as stylish but then changed his mind upon watching the film Mad Max. The combination between Dante's swordsmanship and usage of guns with unlimited ammo made the character feel more unique according to Hiraki before the concept of Devil May Cry was conceived. More acrobatic skills were decided by Kamiya in the making of the game including double jumps despite the initial concept of the game as well as flying when Dante used Devil Trigger. This generated difficulties in the designers from the game. To balance the two protagonists, Dante and Nero were given unique gameplay; Dante retained his change of styles from Devil May Cry 3 but could now change between each of them within a battle rather than a stage.

For Devil May Cry 5, Dante and Nero's characters were developed to play completely different in a similar fashion to Devil May Cry 4 as they employ different mechanics. Itsuno still felt that mastering Dante's skills would be more difficult as a result of the multiple mode and weaponry he executes. The weapon Balrog, which acts as a reference to Street Fighter character Balrog, was the first weapon conceived by the team. It was made to be one of the most appealing weapons but at the same time the hardest to master. The motorcycle that works as a weapon, Cavaliere, was based on a Devil May Cry 2 picture somebody drew based on a motorcycle.

Ninja Theory redesign

For DmC: Devil May Cry, a reboot of the series, Dante was completely redesigned by Italian concept artist Alessandro Taini (known as Talexi), in response to comments by the Capcom staff. Although his original design was meant to resemble those in previous games, Capcom told the Ninja Theory staff that he needed a redesign to appeal to a younger demographic. Motohide Eshiro said that this Dante was completely different from the previous ones, which was expected to generate criticism. Although the original Dante was designed from a Japanese perspective, the new version was made from a Western perspective. After several drafts of Dante's new appearance, the designers settled on a look inspired by Christopher Nolan's film The Dark Knight. Dante's coat is shorter, only reaching his lower back; his hair is black and shorter, and he has a Devil Trigger form which resembles the original Dante. Art designer Alessandro Taini drew the character as a child and explained in the reboot's origin story why he has white hair. Design director Tameem Antoniades denied rumours that Dante was modeled on him.

Dante was made young in this game, inexperienced and consumed by hatred; his fighting style was more like a street brawler than a skilled swordsman. DmC: Devil May Crys theme is rebellion, and most of Dante's actions are based on it.  Antoniades said that Dante is about "being cool and making you feel cool when you're playing it", and they felt that his attire from previous games would be found comical. Antoniades added that the original Dante was no longer appealing, and when he compared the new Dante with the title character in Bayonetta, her style was not what he wanted for DmC: Devil May Cry. Antoniades responded to criticism by saying that Dante would not be changed (since the character suits the game's setting), and that he liked the new version.

Casting
In the first Devil May Cry game, Dante was voiced by Drew Coombs. Coombs was happy to be chosen to voice him, since it was his first job involving a video-game character, and he found the game's recording process fun. According to Coombs, he was offered a script for the job and was told that Devil May Cry was a "spin-off" of Resident Evil. He said that he did not wear anything special while playing the character and had basic storyboards in front of him when his movements were videotaped. Asked if he recognized himself in the character's actions, Coombs said that he could not think of anything in particular; his main job was to "bring [Dante] alive" with his voice. Matt Kaminsky voiced Dante in the sequel.

Dante was voiced by Reuben Langdon, who also did motion capture for some scenes in Devil May Cry 3, 4 and 5. Langdon auditioned for the character four times before he was chosen. Although he played the first Devil May Cry game, he was not aware of the title's popularity. Before the release of Devil May Cry 3, Langdon said that fans were angry with the new teenage Dante's look. After its release, however, he said that the fans had come to enjoy the character's new incarnation. Langdon enjoyed his work on the game, saying that "it was one of the most difficult, frustrating and yet rewarding character of anyone I've ever played". As Langdon faced difficulties with the work, he was thankful towards cast director Mary Elizabeth McGlynn as well as Yutaka Maseba from ADR Production who helped him in the making of the game. He felt that he could enjoy the character even more in Devil May Cry 4.

During the development of Devil May Cry 3, Langdon found Dante's motion capture difficult. He consulted the staff, since they wanted "a different spin" on the character. Eventually, Langdon decided to do his own rendition of Dante because the staff's suggestions confused him. He was told to make Devil May Cry 4s Dante similar to his Devil May Cry 3 persona, but more mature. Despite the staff's concern about the difficulty of such a portrayal, Langdon had no issues after choosing Roy Focker of the anime series The Super Dimension Fortress Macross (who was near Dante's age) as his character model. Langdon said that his favorite motion capture scene from the series was Dante's banter with the antagonist Agnus during Devil May Cry 4 as they did a take on Japanese stage play originally designed by Yuji Shimura.

In the making of Devil May Cry 5, Langdon did not like reading the script for the first time. Although he enjoyed the story and characters, Langdon stated that the initial draft dialogue was "horrible" and had to rewrite some parts. Translator Mike NcNamara reworked the original dialogue much to Langdon's liking alongside Itsuno's. Langdon worked along with Dan Southworth and Johnny Yong Bosch to improve the English translation of the dialogue which they enjoyed. He found Dante as a more over-the-top character than Nero due to Bosch's acting and his handling of calm scenes. During one scene, Dante performs a parody to one of Michael Jackson's dances which the staff knew Langdon could not perform in motion capture. As a result, this scene was performed by a stunt double known as Shibata.

For the Japanese Devil May Cry installments, Dante was given a Japanese voice actor: Toshiyuki Morikawa. Morikawa believes that the character's appeal stems from his courage and lack of concern about money. Overseeing his characterisation, Morikawa joked that female viewers would only enjoy seeing him fight; he is less adept at daily life, and constantly interested in eating. However, he said that Dante might have sex appeal which would attract female viewers.

Tim Phillipps did Dante's motion capture and voice acting in DmC: Devil May Cry. During auditions for the game, he was quickly selected by Antoniades. The actor had no knowledge of the franchise or the reboot until the reveal teaser. He was disappointed that DmC was not an online game since those games allow him to interact more and demonstrate his work. Phillipps enjoyed Dante's characterisation, he could relate to him, and the motion capture enhanced his interest. Thinking that DmC was a prequel rather than a reboot, Phillips did not play the previous games before he worked on Dante's character.

Characteristics 
Dante is a mercenary and private investigator specialising in paranormal cases, preferring those which require demon-slaying. He is muscular, with silverish white hair and piercing icy blue eyes, and usually wears a red duster or trench coat. Dante's arsenal usually consists of firearms and melee weapons, including —twin semi-automatic handguns which never need reloading—and a variety of swords, such as the Rebellion, Force Edge and various "Devil Arms" created from the souls of powerful demons he defeats over the course of each game. The guns are handmade by the gunsmith Nell Goldstein, with "For Tony Redgrave, By .45 Art Warks" written on the slides (Tony Redgrave is Dante's alias). He has superhuman strength, agility, stamina, reflexes, coordination, and a resistance to injury approaching invulnerability as a result of his half-demon heritage. This gives him the ability to enter a heightened state known as Devil Trigger. In this state Dante possesses greater strength and speed, his health regenerates at a steady pace, and he has greater abilities (including flight) with his melee weapon.

He is one of the twin sons of Sparda, a demon knight who sided with humanity and drove back an invasion of the human world by demons about 2,000 years before the series' events. After Sparda's death, Dante and Vergil were raised by their human mother Eva. When Dante and Vergil were children, the family was attacked by demons, and Eva was murdered. His mother's death led to Dante's commitment to hunt the demons who killed her. Dante is confident against opponents, frequently taunting enemies before fighting them. In the games and anime series, Dante is often seen eating pizza. As a result, the limited editions of Devil May Cry 4: Special Edition were packaged in a pizza box.

Appearances 
{{video game timeline
|title= Games featuring Dante
|range1 = 2001–2021
|range1_color = #CCCCFF #C9A0DC
|2001 = Devil May Cry
|2003a = Devil May Cry 2
|2003b =Viewtiful Joe
|2004 = Shin Megami Tensei III: Nocturne
|2005= Devil May Cry 3: Dante's Awakening
|2006a = SNK vs. Capcom: Card Fighters DS
|2006b = Devil May Cry 3: Special Edition
|2006c =Viewtiful Joe: Red Hot Rumble
|2008 = Devil May Cry 4
|2011 = Marvel vs. Capcom 3: Fate of Two Worlds
|2013 = DmC: Devil May Cry
|2011e = Ultimate Marvel vs. Capcom 3
|2012a = Project X Zone
|2012b= PlayStation All-Stars Battle Royale
|2015a = Devil May Cry 4: Special Edition'''
|2015b=DmC: The Definitive Edition|2016  = Project X Zone 2|2017a  =Marvel vs. Capcom: Infinite|2017b= Puzzle Fighter|2019a = Devil May Cry 5 
|2019b=Teppen|2019c=Shin Megami Tensei: Liberation Dx2 
|2020a = Devil May Cry: Pinnacle of Combat|2020b=Devil May Cry 5: Special Edition|2021a=Shin Megami Tensei III: Nocturne HD Remaster|2021b=Super Smash Bros. Ultimate}}

 Devil May Cry video games 
In the original Devil May Cry from 2001, Dante is hired by Trish, a mysterious woman who resembles his late mother, to prevent the return of the devil king Mundus. However, Trish is actually arranging for Mundus' agents to kill Dante as he makes his way to him. One of the agents is the armored soldier Nelo Angelo later revealed to be the mindcontrolled Vergil, Dante's brother. After multiple encounters, Dante defeats Vergil whose body is destroyed, leaving an amulet necessary to unlock their father's legacy, the sword . Trish tries to kill Dante afterwards but Dante spares her when becoming victorious. When Mundus tries to kill Dante, Trish passes Dante her strength to destroy the devil king. Now allied, they become partners in Dante's demon-slaying business, now renamed Devil Never Cry.

In the first sequel, Devil May Cry 2, from 2003, Dante habitually flips a coin to make decisions; at the end of the game, it is revealed that both sides of the coin are heads. Set some time after the first game, Devil May Cry 2 focuses on helping Lucia defeat Arius, an international businessman who uses demonic power and wants to conquer the world. At the end of the game, Dante must go into the demon world to stop a demon lord from escaping; the gate closes behind him, and he is trapped. With no way back to the human world, Dante heads deeper into the demon world on his motorcycle.

The third game, Devil May Cry 3: Dante's Awakening, from 2005 is a prequel of the first game and features a cockier, younger Dante. He is drawn out by Vergil, who is trying to reopen the portal to the demon world to obtain Sparda's full power, which remains on the other side in the Force Edge sword. Dante meets Lady, who is in pursuit of her father Arkham who is working with Vergil but has plans of his own. Inspired by Lady's courage and commitment to her family, Dante continues his business with a greater sense of purpose. At the end of the game, Dante claims ownership of the Force Edge, and Vergil chooses to remain in the demon world. Dante and Lady befriend, with the former deciding to call his shop Devil May Cry after something Lady had said to comfort him.

In the 2008 video game Devil May Cry 4, which takes place after Devil May Cry and Devil May Cry 2, Dante and Trish are informed by Lady that Sanctus, the religious leader of the Order of the Sword founded under Sparda, is using the religious order to engineer his scheme of world conquest. Trish infiltrates the Order as Gloria to confirm it is Sanctus by handing him Vergil's Yamato sword. Dante ends up as a boss character against the game's protagonist, Nero, when he seemingly assassinated Sanctus. Dante falls back while convincing Nero that the Order is more than it appears. Dante later befriends Nero in another match, having intended to take back Vergil's restored sword before deciding to let Nero keep it as they now have a common enemy in Sanctus. After Sanctus kidnaps Nero to use him to power the Savior, Dante becomes playable for the second half of the game as he fights to disable Sanctus completely while saving Nero and his girlfriend Kyrie after they were used to give life to the Savior colossus that Sanctus made into his vessel. Once Sanctus and the Savior are destroyed after Nero and Kyrie escape, Dante entrusts Nero with Vergil's sword.

Dante makes a return appearance as one of the main characters in Devil May Cry 5 in 2019. He is hired by a mysterious man who calls himself V to battle the demon Urizen but is defeated by him in the game's opening scene, presume to be dead as he ends up missing after his defeat. It is revealed that he spent the next month in a coma protected by the sword Sparda. V eventually manages to locate him, and he spends the next several hours fighting Urizen's forces. Dante uses Rebellion's power to absorb the Sparda into himself, acquiring his new demonic powers alongside a new blade simply named . He still discourages Nero from taking part in the battle against Urizen, having learned that Urizen is Vergil, who is also revealed to be Nero's father. After Dante defeats Urizen, V merges with him to reconstitute Vergil. Dante reveals that Vergil is Nero's father before facing his brother in a climactic duel, but Nero intervenes and forces the two to reconcile. Dante and Vergil embark on a one-way trip to the underworld to cut the Qliphoth's root and to seal the portal with the Yamato, leaving the human world in Nero's hands. In the final scene, Dante is shown sparring with Vergil in the underworld, no longer as enemies but as friendly rivals while at the same time fending off waves of demons.

Dante is a playable character in the mobile phone game Devil May Cry: Pinnacle of Combat. During the game's development players criticised Yunchang Games for their rendition of Dante's appearances which resulted into the developers' promising to fix it once the game left the beta period and was released in 2020.

 DmC: Devil May Cry 
In DmC: Devil May Cry (2013), a Devil May Cry reboot, Dante has a very different appearance. In his early twenties, he is attacked in a seemingly sentient town known as Limbo City which is inhabited by demons. Dante meets Vergil, who is the leader of the Order—a rogue vigilante group trying to free the world from demons. The city is controlled by the demon king, Mundus, who killed Dante's mother Eva (an angel), and imprisoned his father, Sparda, (a demon and Mundus' former lieutenant), as well as attempting to kill their children, who are revealed to be Nephilim, half-angel, half-demon offspring, with the power to destroy Mundus. Dante joins Vergil's group to oppose Mundus, eventually defeating him and freeing humanity from the demons; however, Vergil's intention to take Mundus' place triggers a fight between the brothers, with Dante being victorious in the end but sparing Vergil's life. In the downloadable content sequel, Vergil's Downfall, a replica of Dante appears to oppose Vergil in his quest for power and is killed in combat.

 Other games 
Dante is also a playable character in several games outside the Devil May Cry series. In the Viewtiful Joe series (also created by Hideki Kamiya), he is playable in the PlayStation 2 version of Viewtiful Joe and the PlayStation Portable version of Viewtiful Joe: Red Hot Rumble. In both games he talks frequently with Alastor, the embodiment of the identically named sword in Devil May Cry. Dante appears as an enemy and an optional ally in the director's cut version of Shin Megami Tensei: Nocturne, titled Maniax. His inclusion was suggested by the Atlus staff, who thought that he would fit the game's plot and convinced Capcom to include him. Dante is replaced by Raidou Kuzunoha the XIV in the Maniax Chronicle edition and by default in the HD Remaster, but is available as paid DLC in the latter version. Morikawa and Langdon reprise their role as Dante in HD Remaster.There is a Dante character card in SNK vs. Capcom: Card Fighters DS. Although he was also intended for inclusion in SNK vs. Capcom: SVC Chaos, he was removed from the game. Dante made his second fighting-game appearance as a playable character in Marvel vs. Capcom 3: Fate of Two Worlds, and is playable in Marvel vs. Capcom: Infinite which details his fight against a being named Ultron Sigma. As downloadable content in Infinite, Dante's look can be altered to show his DmC appearance.

Dante was scheduled to appear in Soulcalibur III, but did not make it into the final game. Dante is a playable character in the tactical role-playing game Project X Zone, with Demitri Maximoff of Darkstalkers as his partner. He returns in the sequel, Project X Zone 2, with Vergil as his partner. Dante is a playable character in PlayStation All-Stars Battle Royale as his DmC: Devil May Cry incarnation. The use of his DmC look (instead of his original persona) was criticised by fans, who were advised by SuperBot Entertainment to enjoy the character's gameplay mechanics. Dante also appeared in Capcom's mobile fighting game, Puzzle Fighter, and the card game Teppen. He is also a guest character in Atlus' Shin Megami Tensei: Liberation Dx2 mobile phone game. The character's visual appearance has also been featured in Astro's Playroom and as downloadable content in Capcom's Monster Hunter, Sengoku Basara 4 and Street Fighter V. A Mii Fighter costume based on Dante was added to Super Smash Bros. Ultimate via downloadable content on June 29, 2021.

In other media
He appears in other media based on the video games, including two light novels by Shinya Goikeda. A young Dante,  is chased by assassins, and he searches for a demonic statue, known as the Beastheads, in a Devil May Cry 2 prequel. A Devil May Cry 4 novel by Bingo Morihashi reprises Dante's role in the game, revealing his interest in Nero after discovering his resemblance to his brother Vergil. A Devil May Cry 3 manga follows Dante before the game's events; a comic of the first game was published by Dreamwave Productions, and an anime, Devil May Cry: The Animated Series, follows him as he solves cases involving demons while guarding a young girl named Patty Lowell. DmC: Devil May Crys version of Dante appears in the game's prequel comic, The Chronicles of Vergil, when he receives the Rebellion sword to fight demons. The anime inspired two CD dramas whose narrative involves Dante's life. In 2019, Tomio Ogata authored a manga that features Dante's actions in Devil May Cry 5 as he meets V.

In the play Sengoku Basara vs. Devil May Cry he was played by Hiroki Suzuki. In the musical Devil May Cry: The Live Hacker, he was portrayed by Ryōma Baba. The popularity of the Devil May Cry series led to a line of action figures, produced by Toycom; Kaiyodo produced a similar line for Devil May Cry 2 and a Devil May Cry 3 Dante action figure.

 Reception 
Popularity

Dante has been popular in gaming. In 2011, readers of Guinness World Records Gamer's Edition voted Dante as the 28th-top video game character of all time. GameDaily called him one of their favourite Capcom characters, ranking him seventh and saying the varied aspects of the character made him an "unstoppable force". GamesRadar listed Dante as one of the decade's 25 best new characters while also enjoying his rivalry with Vergil. In 2010, he finished 23rd in a Famitsu poll determining Japan's most popular video-game characters. Dante was voted the 13th-best character of the 2000s by Game Informer. GamesRadar said in 2012 that, despite Dante's multiple characterisations, "he's a guy who you'll always have a hell of a time playing with." Dante and Trish were included on The Inquirers list of most memorable video-game love teams, with comments focusing on how they join forces to defeat their enemies. In 2016, Glixel staff ranked Dante as the 22nd most iconic video game character of the 21st century. In promoting Devil May Cry 5, Capcom produced replicas of the character's jacket as limited editions for Japanese gamers. In another promotion, Sony used Dante's image alongside Morikawa's voice to promote pizza.

Dante has also been noted to have sex appeal that attracts gamers of the series. GamesRadar called Dante "Mister 2001" in their article on the sexiest new characters of the decade; compared with Devil May Cry female characters, he was the "hottest" of all because of his muscular build, his hair, his fighting abilities and his attitude. La Nueva España included the "ephebe that exudes testosterone from every pore" in their top ten sexiest video-game characters of both genders.

Because of the character's popularity and Capcom publishing ports for the series on the Nintendo Switch in 2019 and 2020, multiple gamers speculated about the possible inclusion of him as downloadable content in Nintendo's fighting game Super Smash Bros. Ultimate . Devil May Cry director Hideaki Itsuno talked about the possibility of Dante becoming a guest character. But he noted that it might not be possible since at the time he was interviewed about it, Devil May Cry had not been released for Nintendo consoles. However, he also noted that Cloud Strife from Final Fantasy VII made it to the game even though the game had not been released for Nintendo's consoles; he hoped Dante would be added to the cast. Dante was added as a Mii Fighter costume to the game on June 29, 2021, later resulting to Devil May Cry's fans outcry on twitter, following over the disappointing character reveal.

Critical response
Dante has been well received by gaming journalists. Game Informer called him "one of the most bad-ass characters around" when he was introduced, citing the contrast between his character and those previously seen in the Resident Evil series. Meristation regarded Dante's design and characterisation provided by Kamiya as one of the biggest reasons for the iconic character's popularity in hack and slash games. Dante's design and personality was praised by some reviewers; IGN described the character as "a dark antihero kind of guy even a down-in-the-dumps, disgruntled teenager would love." SNK artist Falcoon called him an anti-hero, comparing him with K' (a character in The King of Fighters series). GameSpy described Dante as "awe-inspiring to look at", with attire reminiscent of Vincent Price. Game Rant ranked him as the best Capcom character ever, describing him as "the complete package one wants in a heroic figure." Empire ranked him 38th on their list of the 50 greatest video-game characters, describing him as "surely one of the coolest" characters in the history of video gaming. In a feature article, PSU noted even though Dante's appearance had had multiple designs in different games his appealing personality has remained. Because Dante and Vergil are half demon and half human, they were noted to bring in religious overtones, although it was initially subtle. Ninja Theory made a more direct reference to the way religion is portrayed in gaming while showing the parallels between the identical twins.

Dante's younger persona in Devil May Cry 3 and the relationships he goes through in the narrative were also given a major focus by reviewers and found to be superior to Kamiya's original take. Dante's dynamic with Nero in the following game garnered positive responses as critics found none of them overshadowed the other even if Dante's fans had to wait for the game's second half to control him while enjoying the older characterisation. Dante has often been compared with Bayonetta title character, especially in his Devil May Cry 4 persona, based on their personalities and actions. Hideki Kamiya of PlatinumGames has said that he was approached about having the Sega character Bayonetta included in Project X Zone 2; he refused, wanting Bayonetta and Dante to meet "on his own terms". Kamiya came to regret his decision, realising that fans would have enjoyed the interaction between the characters; if there is a Project X Zone 3, he would strongly support Bayonetta's inclusion. He conducted a poll in 2016 to determine the incarnation of Dante fans would most like to see interact with Bayonetta; the most-popular version was the Devil May Cry 4 Dante.

Early impressions of Dante's appearance in Devil May Cry 5 trailer were also positive. GameSpot noted how fans enjoyed his role as well as design, while VG247 found him more of a "charmer" than in his previous incarnations due to his interactions with other characters. While still finding his character similar to that in previous games, GamesRadar liked Dante's new appearance, his Cavalier weapon and his cocky attitude. Hobby Consolas liked that while Dante retained some of his original skills and weapons, they liked the Cavalier based on how he could wield it in combat. He was also included on HobbyConsolass "The 30 best heroes of the last 30 years." The Guardian highly enjoyed Dante's cocky personality despite him being far older than in previous games. Metro agreed, finding his dynamic with the younger protagonist, Nero, made enjoyable cutscenes whenever they are featured. PC Gamer enjoyed Dante's hat as it provides entertainment in both cutscenes and gameplay. In Japan, there were limited releases of the game that included a jacket based on Dante's. Destructoid enjoyed the impact Vergil has on both Dante and Nero. In the story both his brother and son become far more serious as they take it upon themselves to stop their relative's threat. Despite liking Dante's relationship with Nero to the point of comparing to them as father and son, USGamer found Dante's treatment of the younger demon hunter mean-spirited even though the character later reveals he does not want Nero to face Vergil because of their connection.GamesRadar called Reuben Langdon the character's best voice actor, noting that the other two actors did not fit the character well. Anime News Network agreed, saying that he made the character far more likable in the anime series, despite flaws in the writing. IGN concurred, finding Langdon a better actor than Toshiyuki Morikawa because of his experience with the series. DVD Talk liked the interactions between Dante, Lady and Trish; the reviewer expected more of them in the anime, rather than stories focused on Dante facing enemies. He found Dante appealing in the anime series, based on his personality and actions. According to a FandomPost reviewer, Dante's role in the anime differed from the games in his childish behaviour over food and money; however, he was still "a great character". Otaku USA said that in the anime Dante remained faithful to his game version in his actions, most notably the gory (but limited) fighting. In 2015, Logo TV ranked Dante as the seventeenth on their list of the sexiest male video game characters.

Dante's characterisation has also been criticised. His cocky attitude was largely absent from Devil May Cry 2, a major criticism of the game. Noting that Dante underwent character arcs in the anime series because of his relationships with other cast members, IGN felt that it differed from his game character. According to UK Anime Network, his personality in the Devil May Cry 3 prequel manga lacked development; he appeared unlikable, and the script gave him strange lines.

The character's use of combos in the crossover Marvel vs Capcom 3 was praised by Eurogamer, although the website wondered if he was overpowered. Prima Games ranked his Flaming Sword Strike the 42nd-best technique in gaming, due to its impact on an enemy if the move connects. Both Kotaku and Eurogamer criticised the "weird" appearance of Dante's face in the fighting game Marvel vs. Capcom Infinite. Dante's inclusion in Nocturne and Project X Zone was met with a good response. GamesRadar listed him as one of the best unlockable characters in gaming while commenting about his inclusion in Viewtiful Joe as being  nothing more than a new skin for the title character.

Reaction to the reboot's Dante
Fan reaction to the character's design in the DmC: Devil May Cry reboot was mainly negative. Hideki Kamiya said that it was based on modern, rebellious youth; although he missed the original Dante, he hoped that people would get used to the new version. Dave Riley of Anime News Network compared the reboot's character with the young Dante from Devil May Cry 3, criticising him as a "pretty generic adolescent power fantasy" (including swearing when he confronts enemies). Reuben Langdon was disappointed with Dante's characterisation in the reboot after having looked forward to it. Writers on several websites criticised the fan base's negative reaction, saying that they were influenced solely by the character's look; his personality was very close to the original Dante. Response in East Asia was also negative. Hideaki Itsuno himself was bothered by Dante's change in the reboot along with the major changes in the game to the point he thought about quitting Capcom. According to Langdon, Itsuno decided to stay at Capcom when he expressed desire to have control over the franchise.1UP.com praised Ninja Theory for removing some of Dante's old, unappealing characteristics and making him an approachable protagonist for players. It described the reboot as "a fresh and imaginative take on Dante". According to IGN, the redesigned hero is more relatable for players. Eurogamer also praised Dante's re-design, calling it one of gaming's best reinventions of a character. However, a VideoGamer.com reviewer said that the new Dante lacked some of the original's iconic features. Comparing Dante and Vergil's characterisations in the reboot, Destructoid found Vergil a more entertaining character in spite of gameplay issues. Dustin Chadwell of Gaming Age said that Vergil's gameplay was superior to Dante's, but was confused about his storyline because his survival was not explained. Metro was harsher to Dante's characterisation in DmC'', finding him sexist because his treatment of women, mostly in the introduction scenes to the point of calling him a pervert.

References 

Action-adventure game characters
Capcom protagonists
Cultural depictions of Dante Alighieri
Fictional characters with superhuman durability or invulnerability
Fictional criminals in video games
Demon characters in video games
Devil May Cry characters
Fictional businesspeople in video games
Fictional demon hunters
Fictional gunfighters in video games
Fictional half-demons
Fictional Jeet Kune Do practitioners
Fictional nephilims
Fictional private investigators
Fictional shopkeepers
Fictional hunters in video games
Male characters in video games
Fictional mercenaries in video games
Fictional swordfighters in video games
Fighting game characters
Orphan characters in video games
Science fantasy video game characters
Twin characters in video games
Video game bosses
Video game characters based on real people
Video game characters introduced in 2001
Video game characters who can move at superhuman speeds
Video game characters with accelerated healing
Video game characters with superhuman strength
Vigilante characters in video games